The Big Eight Conference baseball tournament was the conference baseball championship of the NCAA Division I Big Eight Conference from 1976 through 1996.  The winner of the tournament received an automatic berth to the NCAA Division I Baseball Championship.  Throughout the tournament's history, the event was held in Oklahoma City, OK.  Oklahoma State won seventeen titles, including the final sixteen.  Oklahoma and Missouri won two titles each.

Champions

By year
The following is a list of conference champions and sites listed by year.

By school
The following is a list of conference champions listed by school.

References

Tournament
NCAA Division I baseball conference tournaments